Konya Atatürk Stadium was a multi-purpose stadium in Konya, Turkey.  It was used mostly for football matches and was the home ground of Konyaspor.  The stadium held 22,559 people and was built in 1950 and the stadium was demolished in 2018.

References

External links
Venue information

Football venues in Turkey
Konyaspor
Sports venues completed in 1950
Sports venues demolished in 2018
Demolished buildings and structures in Turkey
Süper Lig venues
Things named after Mustafa Kemal Atatürk